The Japanese manga series Neuro: Supernatural Detective was written and illustrated by Yūsei Matsui. The series follows Neuro Nōgami, a demon who feeds on mysteries, as he comes to Earth after solving every mystery in the demon world. To remain unnoticed, he obligates a high school student, Yako Katsuragi, to establish a detective agency.

The manga was first published in Shueisha's magazine Akamaru Jump in the 2004 summer issue as a one-shot; it won the Jump Jūni Ketsu Shinjin Manga Award, and was  "extremely well received". A second one-shot was released on September 6, 2004 in Weekly Shōnen Jump. It was regularly serialized in Weekly Shōnen Jump between February 21, 2005 and April 20, 2009.

The 202 chapters were collected and published into 23 tankōbon volumes by Shueisha starting on July 4, 2005, with the last volume being released on August 4, 2009. The chapter names are originally named in a format "kanji [kana]", in which the kana does not necessarily serves as a furigana to the kanji, but provides different titles sometimes. When this occurs, it is indicated by the brackets in the English titles. Due to the absence of furigana for the kanji, only its kana titles are in romaji.

The manga was adapted into a 25-episode anime series co-produced by Madhouse, Nippon Television (NTV), Shueisha, D.N. Dream Partners and VAP that aired in Japan on NTV from October 2, 2007 to March 25, 2008. The manga has also been licensed in several countries, among them in France by Glénat, in Hong Kong by Culturecom, in Italy and Spain by Planeta DeAgostini, in South Korea by Seoul Media Group, and in Taiwan by Tong Li Publishing.



Volume list

See also
List of Neuro: Supernatural Detective episodes

References

Neuro Supernatural Detective